The Aero L-29 Delfín (NATO reporting name: Maya) is a military jet trainer developed and manufactured by Czechoslovakian aviation manufacturer Aero Vodochody. It is the country's first locally designed and constructed jet aircraft, as well as likely being the biggest aircraft industrial programme to take place in any of the Council for Mutual Economic Assistance (COMECON) countries except the Soviet Union.

In response to a sizable requirement for a common jet-propelled trainer to be adopted across the diverse nations of the Eastern Bloc, Aero decided to embark upon their own design project with a view to suitably satisfying this demand. On 5 April 1959, an initial prototype, designated as the XL-29, performed its maiden flight. The L-29 was selected to become the standard trainer for the air forces of Warsaw Pact nations, for which it was delivered from the 1960s onwards. During the early 1970s, the type was succeeded in the principal trainer role by another Aero-built aircraft, the L-39 Albatros, heavily contributing to a decline in demand for the earlier L-29 and the end of its production during 1974.

During the course of the programme, in excess of 3,000 L-29 Delfin trainers were produced. Of these, around 2,000 were reported to have been delivered to the Soviet Union, where it was used as the standard trainer for the Soviet Air Force. Of the others, which included both armed and unarmed models, many aircraft were delivered to the various COMECON countries while others were exported to various overseas nations, including Egypt, Syria, Indonesia, Nigeria and Uganda. Reportedly, the L-29 has been used in active combat during several instances, perhaps the most high-profile being the use of Nigerian aircraft during the Nigerian Civil War of the late 1960s and of Egyptian L-29s against Israeli tanks during the brief Yom Kippur War of 1973.

Development

In the late 1950s, the Soviet Air Force commenced a search for a suitable jet-powered replacement for its fleet of piston-engined trainers; over time, this requirement was progressively broadened towards the goal of developing a trainer aircraft that could be adopted and in widespread use throughout the national air forces of the Eastern Bloc countries. Around the same time, the nation of Czechoslovakia had also been independently developing its own requirements for a suitable jet successor to its current propeller-powered trainer aircraft. In response to these demands, Aero decided to develop its own aircraft design; the effort was headed by a pair of aerospace engineers, Z. Rublič and K. Tomáš. Their work was centered upon the desire to produce a single design that would be suitable both performing basic and advanced levels of the training regime, carrying pilots straight through to being prepared to operate frontline combat aircraft.

The basic design concept was to produce a straightforward, easy-to-build and operate aircraft. Accordingly, both simplicity and ruggedness were stressed in the development process, leading to the adoption of manual flight controls, large flaps, and the incorporation of perforated airbrakes positioned on the fuselage sides. Aerodynamically, the L-29 was intentionally designed to possess stable and docile flight characteristics; this decision contributed to an enviable safety record for the type. The sturdy L-29 was able to operate under austere conditions, including performing take-offs from grass, sand or unprepared fields. On 5 April 1959, the prototype XL-29 conducted its maiden flight, powered by a British Bristol Siddeley Viper turbojet engine. The second prototype, which flew shortly thereafter, was instead powered by the Czech-designed M701 engine. The M-701 engine was used in all subsequent aircraft.

During 1961, a small pre-production batch of L-29s were evaluated against the Polish PZL TS-11 Iskra and the Russian Yakovlev Yak-30, the main rival submissions for the Warsaw Pact's standardised trainer. Shortly after the completion of the fly-offs, it was announced that the L-29 had been selected as the winner; according to aviation author John C. Fredrikson, this outcome had been highly unexpected and surprising to several observers. Regardless of the result, Poland chose to continue to pursue the development and procurement of the TS-11; however, all of the other Warsaw Pact countries decided to adopt the Delfin under the agreements of COMECON.

During April 1963, full-scale production of the L-29 commenced; 3,600 aircraft were manufactured over a production run of 11 years. During its production life, several derivatives of the L-29 were developed, such as a dedicated, single-seat, aerobatic version, which was designated as the L-29A Akrobat. Another model, an armed reconnaissance version complete with multiple downwards-looking cameras installed in the rear cockpit position, referred to as the L-29R, was also under development; however, during 1965, the L-29R project was terminated. Optional armaments could be installed upon some models, consisting of either a detachable gun pod or a pod containing up to four unguided missiles, which could be set upon hardpoints underneath each wing.

Design
The Aero L-29 Delfín was a jet-powered trainer aircraft, known for its straightforward and simplistic design and construction. In terms of its basic configuration, it used a mid-wing matched with a T-tail arrangement; the wings were unswept and accommodated air intakes for the engines within the wing roots. The undercarriage was reinforced and capable of withstanding considerable stresses. According to Fredriksen, the L-29 was relatively underpowered, yet exhibited several favourable characteristics in its flight performance, such as its ease of handling. The primary flying controls are manually operated; both the flaps and airbrakes were actuated via hydraulic systems.

Production aircraft were powered by the Czech-designed Motorlet M-701 turbojet engine, which was capable of generating up to 1,960lbf of thrust. Between 1961 and 1968, approximately 9,250 engines were completed; according to reports, no fewer than 5,000 of these engines were manufactured in support of the Delfin programme. The student pilot and their instructor were placed in a tandem seating layout underneath separate canopies, the instructor being placed in a slightly elevated position to better oversee the student. Both the student and instructor were provisioned with ejection seats; these were intentionally interlinked to fire in a synchronised manner if either seat was deployed as to eliminate any possibility of a mid-air collision between the two ejector seats.

During their late life, many L-29s were resold onto private operators and have seen use in the civil sector. It has become common for various modifications to be carried out to convert the type for such use; these changes would commonly include the removal of military-orientated equipment (such as the gun sight), the replacement of the metric altimeters with Western counterparts, the addition of alternative radio systems, and new ejection seats. It was also routine for several subsystems, such as the oxygen system, to be disabled rather than removed.

Operational history

In excess of 2,000 L-29 Delfins were ultimately supplied to the Soviet Air Force. Like the majority of Soviet-operated aircraft, it acquired its own NATO reporting name, "Maya." In the trainer role, the L-29 enabled air forces to adopt an "all-through" training regime using only jet-powered aircraft, entirely replacing earlier piston-engined types.

The Delfin served in basic, intermediate and weapons training roles. For this latter mission, they were equipped with hardpoints to carry gunpods, bombs or rockets; according to Fredrikson, the L-29 functioned as a relatively good ground-attack aircraft when deployed as such. It saw several uses in this active combat role, such as when a number of Egyptian L-29s were dispatched on attack missions against Israeli ground forces during the Yom Kippur War of 1973. The type was also used in anger during the Nigerian Civil War of the late 1960s. On 16 July 1975, a Czechoslovak Air Force L-29 reportedly shot down a Polish civilian biplane piloted by Dionizy Bielański, who had been attempting to defect to the West.

The L-29 was supplanted in the inventory of many of its operators by the Aero L-39 Albatros. The L-29 which was commonly used alongside the newer L-39 for a time. The type was used extensively to conduct ground attack missions in the First Nagorno-Karabakh War by Azeri forces. At least 14 were shot down by Armenian air-defences, out of the total inventory of 18 L-29s; the Azeri Air Force lost large amounts of its air force due to anti aircraft fire.

On 2 October 2007, an unmodified L-29 was used for the world's first jet flight powered solely by 100 per cent biodiesel fuel. Pilots Carol Sugars and Douglas Rodante flew their Delphin Jet from Stead Airport, Reno, Nevada to Leesburg International Airport, Leesburg, Florida in order to promote environmentally friendly fuels in aviation.

The L-29, much like its L-39 successor, has found use in air racing, some of which have been re-engined with the British Armstrong Siddeley Viper turbojet engine. From 10 September to 14 September 2008, a pair of L-29s took first and second place at the Reno Air Races.  Both L-29s consistently posted laps at or above 500 miles per hour; former Astronaut Curt Brown took first place in "Viper," followed by Red Bull racer Mike Mangold in "Euroburner."

Russia has claimed that it destroyed a pair of Georgian L-29s during the 2008 South Ossetia war. On 18 January 2015, separatist forces in the War in Donbass claimed that they possessed an operational L-29.

Operators

Current military operators

  National Air Force of Angola – 6 L-29s were in service as of December 2016.
  Army Air Section - 4 L-29s were in service as of December 2016.

Former military operators
  The Afghan Air Force operated as many as 24 from 1978 to as late as 1999.
  The Armenian Air Force
  The Azerbaijani Air and Air Defence Force
  Bulgarian Air Force operated 102 examples, delivered between 1963–1974, retired from service in 2002.
  Czech Air Force

  PLAAF got 4 L-29s in 1968.
  The Czechoslovak Air Force
  East German Air Force
  Egyptian Air Force – withdrawn
  Ghana Air Force
  Military of Guinea
  Hungarian Air Force

  Indonesian Air Force
  Iraqi Air Force – Received 78 L-29s between 1968 and 1974. A number were converted to Unmanned aerial vehicles in the 1990s. No longer operated
  Libyan Arab Republic Air Force 20 L29s recorded lost in 1987 during the final stages of the Chadian–Libyan conflict
  Air Force of Mali – 6 in service as of December 2012.
  Nigerian Air Force
  Romanian Air Force – all the L-29s were retired in 2006
  Slovak Air Force – after dissolution of Czechoslovakia, 16 L-29 were given to newly independent Slovak Air Force. They were withdrawn in 2003.
  Syrian Air Force
  Ugandan Air Force
  Ukrainian Air Force
  Vietnam People's Air Force
  United States Navy
  operated as many as 2,000
 DOSAAF
 Soviet Air Force

Civilian operators

 Private L-29C, OK-ATS, Czech Jet Team Žatec – Macerka. Plane crashed on 10 June 2012, killing pilot and passenger.
 Private L-29, OK-AJW, Blue Sky Service Brno – Tuřany 

 Two private L-29s, C-FLVB & C-FXZI, operated by International Test Pilots School, Canada as Flight Test Training tools.
 Two private L-29s, operated by the ACER Cold War Museum. Ex-Bulgarian Air Force.
 Private L-29, operated by Waterloo Warbirds.
 
 One L-29C, OY-LSD owned by Lasse Rungholm, Niels Egelund (until 31.12.2015), Claus Brøgger and Kåre Selvejer.

  L-29 ZK-SSU and ZK-VAU operated by Soviet Star from Christchurch International Airport.

 One civilian L-29 and one L-29 Viper operated by Feniks Aeroclub outside Moscow
 
 One private L-29C, OM-JET, owned by Ján Slota
 One L-29, OM-JLP is owned by Slovtepmont Inc.
 Cpt. Jozef Vaško and col. Radomil Peca in retirement are owners of one L-29, OM-SLK 

 Two are operated by the University of Iowa College of Engineering's Operator Performance Laboratory. Used as high dynamics flight research aircraft for development of pilot state characterization
 One L-29, N29CZ, is operated by World Heritage Air Museum, in Detroit, Michigan.
 One as an avionics high dynamics flight test aircraft at the Ohio University Avionics Engineering Center

Accidents
 On 18 August 2000, a privately owned L-29 was destroyed after it impacted with the water during an aerobatic display at the Eastbourne Airbourne Air Show, at Eastbourne, East Sussex, England. The pilot, a former member of the Royal Air Force's (RAF) Red Arrows display team, was killed with no visible signs of attempting to eject from the aircraft.
 On 18 September 2022, a privately-owned L-29 crashed while taking part in the Reno Air Races in Nevada, killing the pilot.

Specifications (L-29)

See also

References

Citations

Bibliography
 Fredriksen, John C. International Warbirds: An Illustrated Guide to World Military Aircraft, 1914–2000. ABC-CLIO, 2001. .
 Gunston, Bill, ed. "Aero L-29 Delfin." The Encyclopedia of World Air Power. New York: Crescent Books, 1990. .
 Hoyle, Craig. "World Air Forces Directory". Flight International. Vol. 180, No. 5321. 13–19 December 2011. pp. 26–52. ISSN 0015-3710.
 Hoyle, Craig. "World Air Forces Directory". Flight International. Vol. 182, No. 5370. 11–17 December 2012. pp. 40–64. ISSN 0015-3710.
 Hoyle, Craig. "World Air Forces Directory". Flight International. Vol. 188, No. 5517. 8–14 December 2015. pp. 26–53. ISSN 0015-3710.

Taylor, John W. R. Jane's All The World's Aircraft 1971–72. London:Jane's Yearbooks,1971. .
 Vala, Vojtec. "Saddam's Deadly Drones". Aviation News. Vol 65, No, 5. May 2003. pp. 355–357.
 "World Air Forces 2004" Flight International. Vol. 166, No. 4960. 16–22 November 2004. pp. 41–100. ISSN 0015-3710.

External links

(1961) Aero L-29 Delfin Flight Manual
Czech Jet Team — civilian display team.
Aircraft.co.za – The Complete Aviation Reference
Warbird Alley L-29 Page
Gauntlet Warbirds — L-29 Training in the Chicago Area
Walkaround L-29 Delfin from Poltava
Walkaround L-29 Delfin from Yegoryevsk
Walkaround L-29 Delfin from Zaporozhye
Soviet Star, Christchurch, New Zealand
Double X Aviation Ltd, Queenstown, New Zealand

L-29
1950s Czechoslovakian military trainer aircraft
Single-engined jet aircraft
Mid-wing aircraft
T-tail aircraft
Aircraft first flown in 1959